Lukas Schöfl (born 11 February 2001) is an Austrian professional footballer who plays for Floridsdorfer AC on loan from Wolfsberger AC.

Club career
On 30 June 2022, Schöfl joined Floridsdorfer AC on loan.

References

Living people
2001 births
Footballers from Vienna
Association football midfielders
Austrian footballers
Austria youth international footballers
Wolfsberger AC players
Floridsdorfer AC players
Austrian Football Bundesliga players
Austrian Regionalliga players